The Piraeus Apollo is an archaic-style bronze dating from the 6th century BC, possibly  from the years 530–520 BC, exhibited now at the Archaeological Museum of Piraeus, Athens.

Overview

The Piraeus Apollo is a product of the late archaic period (530–480 BC), and is among the few bronzes from that time period to have survived.  It is also thought to be a very rare survival of a piece that may have been actually used as the cult image in a Greek temple.  In the last few decades of the 6th century, the philosophical mystic currents were to have a considerable influence on late archaic art. The logical move from Ionian natural philosophy to metaphysics was the conscious decision of post-archaic mind. In the post-archaic period, the illusive imaginative reality was displaced by harmony and symmetry.

The method of interaction and analogy was perfected  by Polykleitos in the classical period. He used the principle of continuity and in his famous sculptures each member transmitted to the next a part of his existence; therefore there was a harmonious analogy with the rest of the parts. It seems that his canon (: norm, standard) was a standardization which in his opinion led to the "ideal form". The discovery of the perfect mathematical relation was a continuous attempt of the Greek architects.

See also
 Artistic canons of body proportions

References

Further reading
 Dafas, K. A., 2019. Greek Large-Scale Bronze Statuary: The Late Archaic and Classical Periods, Institute of Classical Studies, School of Advanced Study, University of London, Bulletin of the Institute of Classical Studies, Monograph, BICS Supplement 138 (London), pp. 97–116, pls 82–126.

External links
Piraeus Apollo (Sculpture), Tufts University

6th-century BC Greek sculptures
Archaic Greek sculptures
Bronze sculptures in Greece
Sculptures of Apollo
Ancient Greek bronze statues of the classical period
Ancient Athens
Statues in Greece
Sculptures of men in Greece
Sculptures in Piraeus
Archaeological Museum of Piraeus
Archaeological discoveries in Greece
1959 archaeological discoveries
Nude sculptures
Cult images